S1000 may refer to :
 S1000 submarine class, a joint development by Russia and Italy
 Akai S1000, a 1988 16-bit professional stereo digital sampler